Tokyo Joe may refer to:
Tokyo Joe (film) (1949), starring Humphrey Bogart
Tokyo Joe (album), by Ryuichi Sakamoto and Kazumi Watanabe
"Tokyo Joe" (Bryan Ferry song), from the album In Your Mind
a nickname for Ken Eto (1919–2004), Japanese-American mobster and FBI informant
The ring name of professional wrestler Mr. Hito
The ring name of professional wrestler Tsuneharu Sugiyama